Last Days of Coney Island is a 2015 American adult animated short film written, produced, directed and animated by Ralph Bakshi. The story concerns a NYPD detective, the sex worker he alternately loves and arrests, and the seedy characters that haunt the streets of New York City's run-down amusement district. It is notable for being the last film that Bakshi directed and animated before he retired from animation.

Plot

Taking place in Brooklyn, New York during the 1960s, Shorty (voiced by Omar Jones) rants about how the display of the striptease dancer is disgusting and how it reminds him of his mother. He then tells the story of him spotting his mother, who is a fortune teller, having sex with a clown. Shorty then murders both of them, with their body parts flying everywhere, piquing the interest of the mafia, eventually becoming one of them.

The film then transitions to the Stool Pidgeon Bar, a hangout for cops, where he sees his girl Molly (voiced by Tina Romanus), with her being unaware that Shorty is coming. Shorty then says it's all part of his true story and that she hangs out with a cop named Max (voiced by Robert Costanzo), who he despises.

Production

Development

Ralph Bakshi had previously pitched the film to major studios such as Pixar and DreamWorks, but was unable to find anyone who wanted to take on the project. When technology began advancing to the point where Bakshi could begin the project on a lower budget, he decided to take on the project himself and produce it independently working with a small development crew in New Mexico. Bakshi is quoted as saying that the animation is "probably higher quality than anything I ever made, at a cost so low it's embarrassing. Everything I used to do in my old movies that required hundreds of people and huge salaries is now done in a box. It took 250 people to make Heavy Traffic, now I'm down to five. I kiss the computer every morning — f-----' unbelievable!"

Production was announced in 2006, attracting much interest, but no official funding, and according to Bakshi, "I had about eight minutes of film and a completed script. I thought budget was a slam dunk. For a Bakshi comeback film, it seemed like a no-brainer. [...] I asked one guy [in Hollywood], 'Should I have a budget of $150 million and pocket the rest?' He said, 'Yeah, but you have to make it PG'". Bakshi ended the production to rethink his approach towards the film. Its production status was left uncertain.

On October 20, 2012, at Dallas Comic-Con: Fan Days, Ralph Bakshi participated in a Q&A where it was stated that he would take Last Days of Coney Island to Kickstarter in an attempt to crowdsource the funding.

A Kickstarter campaign was launched on February 1, 2013 to complete funding for the first short in the film. On March 3, the film was successfully funded and raised $174,195 from 1,290 backers, and Bakshi confirmed production had begun.

Casting
When the project was first announced on Kickstarter, voice actress Tina Romanus, who had previously worked with Baskhi on Wizards and Hey Good Lookin', was confirmed to play the role of Molly, the main character's love interest. In February 2013, actor Matthew Modine was cast in the film after coming across the film's Kickstarter campaign online in the role of Shorty, described as "a 4-foot-tall mafia collector who thinks he's Elvis Presley and sings like Chet Baker".

Omar Jones ended up replacing Matthew Modine in the lead role of Shorty.  Other voices include Ralph himself, Eddie Bakshi, Jess Gorell, Jonathan Yudis, Joey Camen and Ron Thompson.

Animation

Much of the production was aided with the use of Toon Boom Studio, computer software designed to assemble 2D animation. Ralph Bakshi is quoted as saying "Eddie [Bakshi's son] began some coloring and refining of artwork in Photoshop then gradually moved over to doing this in Toon Boom Studio. The crossover was relatively painless. The programs worked well together. [...] I set up the picture in a traditional manner then Eddie uses Toon Boom Studio to do everything else. My animator Doug Compton also uses Toon Boom Studio to assemble and send pencil tests and animatics. Toon Boom Studio essentially becomes the studio."

Early on, Colleen Cox was announced to be the lead animator of the film. Tsukasa Kanayama was also hired as a storyboard artist, with Joseph Baptista helping with the storyboarding and also helping with some of the character designs. Animator Elana Pritchard was also hired to contribute a sequence in January 2014. British illustrator Ian Miller was hired to help with the background art for the film; Miller had previously worked with Baskhi on Wizards and Cool World.

Release
Last Days of Coney Island premiered on Bakshi's 77th birthday on October 29, 2015 on Vimeo. Bakshi released the film for free on YouTube on October 13, 2016.

References

External links
 
 

2010s American animated films
Films directed by Ralph Bakshi
Films set in Coney Island
American independent films
American neo-noir films
Animated films set in Brooklyn
Kickstarter-funded films
Films set in amusement parks
2015 films
2015 short films
2015 animated films
Films with screenplays by Ralph Bakshi
Films produced by Ralph Bakshi
American adult animated films
2010s English-language films